Samite may refer to :

 Samite, a heavy silk fabric, of a twill-type weave, worn in the Middle Ages
 Samite Mulondo, Ugandan-American musician
 SS Samite, a Liberty ship